Shamchaurasi is a town and a municipal council in Hoshiarpur district in the Indian state of Punjab. It is also a constituency of the Punjab Legislative Assembly. In 2019, the Punjab Government announced that Shamchaurasi  would be upgraded to a sub-tehsil. Shamchaurasi is home to Sham Chaurasia gharana of the Hindustani Classical music.

Demographics
 India census, Shamchaurasi had a population of 4221. Males constitute 52% of the population and females 48%. Shamchaurasi has an average literacy rate of 69%, higher than the national average of 59.5%: male literacy is 75%, and female literacy is 63%. In Shamchaurasi, 13% of the population is under 6 years of age.

Notable people
 Amanat Ali Khan Famous Singer
 Fateh Ali Khan Famous singer and younger brother of Amanat Ali Khan
 Salamat Ali Khan
 Nazakat Ali Khan
 Sharafat Ali Khan
 Shafqat Ali Khan

References

Cities and towns in Hoshiarpur district